Garrison Cemetery (Danish: Garnisons Kirkegård) is a cemetery in Copenhagen, Denmark. It was inaugurated in 1671 on a site just outside the Eastern City Gate, as a military cemetery complementing the naval Holmens Cemetery which had been inaugurated a few years earlier on a neighbouring site. Later the cemetery was opened to civilian burials as well.

Garrison Cemetery is an independent cemetery, managed by the parochial church council, placed under the army's highest authority.

History
Originally named Soldaterkirkegården (Soldiers' Cemetery), Garrison Cemetery was founded by a decree from King Frederick III and laid out in 1664 on a site outside the Bastioned Fortifications, next to the main road leading in and out of the Eastern City Gate and opposite the naval Holmens Cemetery which was laid out around the same time. Burials began the same year but the site, former marshland, was rather unsuitable for the purpose since ground water levels made it hard to bury the bodies in sufficiently deep grounds. In 1671, some improvements were made when the site was enclosed by pallisades and ditches and the cemetery was officially inaugurated on 13 July 1671.

During the first decades, the cemetery remained relatively little used. In 1706, the Garrison Church was built on Sankt Annæ Plads. and in 1723 the Soldiers' Cemetery received its current name.

In 1711, Copenhagen was struck by an outbreak of plague which killed an estimated 23,000 citizens. In a move to control disease, the authorities provided that all victims of the plague, within 24 hours and without a ceremony, had to be buried at Garrison Cemetery or a Municipal Plague Cemetery which was set up next to it. In 1720, Garrison Cemetery was officially opened to civilian burials.

The cemetery was neglected and gradually fell into disrepair. In 1812 it was renovated and from then on began to attract more prominent citizens.

Garrison Cemetery today
One of the many characteristics of the cemetery, are the many old graves, still owned by families, and war-monuments of fallen in the wars 1848–1850 and 1864.

Interments

Niels Andersen (1835–1911)
Christian Henrik Arendrup
Erni Arneson
Ferdinand Bauditz
Gustav Bauditz
Peter Bauditz
Sten Baadsgaard
Hans Bendix
Carl Bernhard
Johannes Bjerg
Fredbjørn Bjørnsson
Nicolai Gottlieb Blædel
Caspar Leuning Borch
Valborg Borchsenius
Poul Borum
Caspar Johannes Boye
Else Brems
Mogens Brems
Erik Bøgh
Georg Carstensen
Georg Christensen
Inger Christensen
Walter Christmas
Flemming Dahl
Benthe Frederikke Rafsted Dannemand
John Davidsen
Anton Dorph
Frederik Dreyer
Ernst Eberlein
William Falck
J. S. Fibiger
Johannes Fibiger
J. F. Fischer
Preben Fjederholt
John Frandsen
Paul René Gauguin
Johannes Grenness
Signi Grenness
Barbara Gress
Hans Hansen
N. C. Hansen
Varvara Hasselbalch
Jens Hecht-Johansen
Cai Hegermann-Lindencrone
Eva Heramb
Aage Hertel
Gustav Frederik Holm
F. C. Holstein
Kirsten Hüttemeier
Jesper Høm
Kirsten Høm
H. E. Hørring
Kræsten Iversen
Johannes W. Jacobsen
Palle Jacobsen
Holger Jensen
Jørn Jeppesen
Tjek Jerne
Anton Eduard Kieldrup
Tove Kjarval
Ove Krak
Thorvald Krak
Lili Lani
Buster Larsen
Gorm Lertoft
Otto Liebe
Axel Liebmann
Nanna Liebmann
Albert Luther
Vilhelm Herman Oluf Madsen
Rasmus Malling-Hansen
Kristian Mantzius
Einer Mellerup
Christian de Meza
Louis Moe
N. C. Monberg
Karin Monk
Gunnar Møller
Johan Waldemar Neergaard
Carl Neumann
Henry Nielsen
Jakob Nielsen
Orson Nielsen
H. G. Olrik
Verner Panton
Hortense Panum
Peter Ludvig Panum
Holger Pedersen
Jens Louis Petersen
Constantin Philipsen
Mie Philipsen
Preben Philipsen
Axel Preisler
Børge Ralov
Kirsten Ralov
Edvard Rambusch
Kirsten Rolffes
Thomas Rosenberg
Tutta Rosenberg
Olaf Rye
Sophus Schack
Ole Scherfig
August Schiøtt
Alfred Schmidt
Svenn Seehusen
Jørgen Selchau
Flemming Skov
Jørgen Sperling
C. F. Sørensen
August Saabye
Hans Nicolai Thestrup
Knud Thestrup
C. F. Thomsen
Christian Frederik Thorin
Carl Thrane
A. F. Tscherning
Mona Vangsaae
Jens Vige
Emilie Walbom
Soffy Walleen
Per Wiking
Hans Wright

The cemetery contains one Commonwealth war grave of World War II, a Danish officer of the British Royal Army Service Corps. Danish-born British Army Brigadier Percy Hansen, a Victoria Cross recipient, is also buried here.

References

External links

 Official website
 CWGC: Copenhagen (Garnisons) Cemetery

Cemeteries in Copenhagen
1671 establishments in Denmark
Commonwealth War Graves Commission cemeteries in Denmark
Danish military memorials and cemeteries
Cemeteries established in the 17th century